"Damsel in Distress" is a song by Rufus Wainwright. On February 27, 2020, the song was released as the second single for his ninth studio album Unfollow the Rules, released by BMG in April 2020.

Composition
Wainwright wrote the song to honor Joni Mitchell. He said, "My husband and I now live in Laurel Canyon. I wasn't that familiar with Joni's music but Jörn [Weisbrodt] became obsessed and took me on a journey into her music. We ended up hanging out with her and I get now why she's one of the greats. So it's part Laurel Canyon, part a song about a personal relationship that I'm trying to come to terms with, but mostly my Mitchell virginity being broken."

Music video
The song's animated music video features "a woman in bellbottoms sauntering through landscapes with the song's lyrics displayed in the clouds".

Track listing
Stream
 "Damsel in Distress" – 4:42
 "Trouble in Paradise" – 3:05

References

External links
 
 

2020 singles
2020 songs
Animated music videos
BMG Rights Management singles
Joni Mitchell
Rufus Wainwright songs
Songs written by Rufus Wainwright
Songs about musicians